The 1989 Virginia gubernatorial election was held on November 7, 1989. Incumbent Democratic Governor Jerry Baliles was unable to seek a second term due to term limits. Democratic nominee and Lieutenant Governor L. Douglas Wilder went against former Attorney General of Virginia J. Marshall Coleman in one of the closest elections in Virginia history. Upon taking the oath of office in January 1990, Governor Wilder became the first African-American governor of Virginia, and the first African-American governor of any state since Reconstruction more than one hundred years earlier.

This remains the last election in which a party won the governorship for a third consecutive term.

Republican primary

Candidates
J. Marshall Coleman, former Attorney General of Virginia, 1981 Republican nominee for Governor
Stanford Parris, U.S. Representative
Paul S. Trible, Jr., former U.S. Senator

General election

Results

Results by county and city

References

Gubernatorial
1989
Virginia
November 1989 events in the United States